Humayoun Ashraf is a Pakistani film and television actor. He appeared as Haroon in Ishq Hamari Galiyon Mein, for which he received the Hum Award for Best Soap Actor in 2013. He made his film debut in 2019 with romantic musical film Sacch.

Early and personal life 
Ashraf was born in 1986 in Karachi.

Filmography

Television

References

External links 
 

Pakistani television directors
Pakistani male television actors
Living people
1986 births
People from Karachi
Male actors from Karachi